Vivian Edwards (September 10, 1896 – December 4, 1949) was an American actress of silent film.

Biography
Born in Los Angeles in 1896, Edwards began her film career with the Keystone Film Company. A 1916 magazine article described her as "one of Mack Sennet's most charming fun-makers." She often played in Charlie Chaplin's earliest films in 1914 and 1915.  Her role as one of the Goo Goo sisters in The Property Man, starring Chaplin was one of her most memorable roles. She is credited in 57 silent films. In 1926, she married director, Bryan Foy. They had one daughter, Mary Jane (Foy) Landstrom.

Partial filmography
 The Property Man (1914)
 Those Love Pangs (1914) - Brunette
 The Face on the Bar Room Floor (1914) - Model
 The Masquerader (1914)
 His New Profession (1914)
 Dough and Dynamite (1914) - visitor
 That Little Band of Gold (1915)
 Do-Re-Mi-Boom! (1915) - Girl in hotel lobby

References

External links

1896 births
1949 deaths
20th-century American actresses
Actresses from Los Angeles
American film actresses
American silent film actresses
Burials at Calvary Cemetery (Los Angeles)